Mantras is the fourth studio album by Czech black metal band Master's Hammer, independently-released on 3 December 2009. It is the band's first album of new material since Šlágry on 1995, and sees them returning to the black metal style of their first two albums, but blending it with the experimental sound demonstrated on Šlágry. It was released both in CD and vinyl format; the vinyl version contains less tracks.

The track "Vrana" is a tribute to painter Martin Vrana, a long-time friend of Master's Hammer's vocalist Franta Štorm. Vrana illustrated the album's cover art.

"Jáma pekel" was originally featured on the band's debut album, Ritual..

Track listing

Note
Tracks 9 to 12 are absent of the vinyl release.

Personnel
 František "Franta" Štorm – vocals, guitar, drums, production
 Tomáš "Necrocock" Kohout – guitars
 Tomáš "Monster" Vendl – bass
 Honza "Silenthell" Přibyl – timpani
 Vlastimil "Vlasta" Voral – keyboards
 Martin Vrana – cover art

References

2009 albums
Master's Hammer albums
Self-released albums